The SFG 87 (Singapore Fragmentation Grenade) is a defensive fragmentation hand grenade created in Singapore. It is one of the grenades used for infantry divisions within the Singapore Armed Forces. It is manufactured by Singaporean weapons manufacturer ST Kinetics, and has been mass-produced since 1987, replacing the older SFG 82 and SFG 75 variants.

Overview 
The SFG 87 has a military green plastic pre-fragmented body with approximately 2800 steel balls, each one having a diameter of 2 mm, ingrained into the inner shell. The shell has distinct ribbing across the outer surface. The grenade has an overall length of 110 mm and a diameter of 54 mm.

The grenade contains approximately 150 grams of Composition B, which is ignited by pulling the safety pin, thus igniting the primer with the use of a Percussion Mechanism when the grenade is thrown, and the lever is released. Once ignited, the fuse lasts 4.5 seconds before exploding.

The grenade has a significantly smaller diameter than other grenades its length, such as the M67 grenade and the  grenade. It was a deliberate design decision by Chartered Industries in order to give the smaller statured soldiers an easier time of usage.

The grenade is able to withstand temperatures from -20 °C to +50 °C before being at risk of structural damage or premature explosion. The SFG 87 has reusable practice and drill variants, such as the SPG 93, commonly used to train military personnel, with the safety marker painted blue for easy identification. On detonation, the SFG 87 has a maximum kill radius of 5 m, and a casualty radius of 20 m.  It has a safety radius of 25 m.

Variants

SFG 75 
A predecessor of the SFG 82 and copy of the US M33 Grenade. Unlike the SFG 75 and SFG 82, this grenade features no ribs. The grenade has a length of 93 mm and a diameter of 57. It has an olive green cast-steel body with yellow markers. The SFG 75 has a casualty radius of 10 m and a safety radius of 15 m.

SFG 82 
A predecessor of the SFG 87. The grenade has a length 105 mm and a diameter of 54 mm. It has the same amount of explosive filler as the SFG 87 at 300 g, and also contains 80 grams of Composition B. It has a similar appearance to the SFG 87, having an olive green plastic body. It has a casualty radius of 10 m and a safety radius of 15 m.

Anti-Frogman AFG 
 
A larger variant of the standard SFG 87 designed for and used against frogmen and infantry in underwater conditions. The AFG (Anti-Frogman Grenade) contains more explosive filler as the regular grenade, with around 180 g of Composition B. It features a pyrotechnic fuse which allows the grenade to detonate between depths of 3 m to 8 m. The AFG has a much larger length of 138 mm and a diameter of 54 mm. It has a casualty radius of 10 m, and a safety radius of around 30 m.

Singapore Army 
In the Singapore Army, the SFG 87 is used by full-time servicemen, National Service Men and reservists as an anti-personnel grenade. Currently, the Singapore Army is the only user of the SFG 87. For armoured infantry squads, each soldier carries two SFG 87 grenades on their person. The grenade is commonly used in close quarters combat or territorial warfare.

Incidents

Assassination of Rajiv Gandhi 

On 21 May 1991, former Prime Minister of India Rajiv Gandhi was assassinated in a suicide bombing by Thenmozhi Rajaratnam, who had detonated a explosive-laden belt hidden below her dress. During the investigation, a report by SIT Explosives Expert Major Manik Sab-harwal indicated that the pellets from the grenades from the belt were identical to that of the SFG 87. In addition, the conclusion that RDX was the only explosive present, and the discovery of markings similar to that of the grenade were uncanny. CBI officials ended up concluding that the Singaporean-made grenades were present at the assassination, which further developed speculation that LTTE bases were present in Singapore.

See also 

 Singapore Armed Forces
 Singapore Army
 Grenade

References 



Grenades
Explosives